Roy Grinker may refer to:
 Roy R. Grinker Sr. (1900–1990), American neurologist and psychiatrist
 Roy Richard Grinker (born 1961, American author and professor of anthropology